The SAP Enterprise Architecture Framework (EAF) is a methodology and toolset by the German multinational software company SAP. It is based on The Open Group Architecture Framework (TOGAF).

The TOGAF Architecture Development Method is a generic method for architecture development, which is designed to deal with most system and organizational requirements. It is usually tailored or extended to suit specific needs.

See also 
 Enterprise architecture framework
 SAP ERP

References

External links
SAP Methodology for Accelerated Transformation to SOA
SAP Enterprise Architecture Framework Unveiled:Aligning IT to the Business

Enterprise architecture frameworks
Enterprise Architecture Framework
Service-oriented (business computing)
Software architecture